Dorothy Virginia Margaret Juba (December 11, 1927 – May 3, 1990), known professionally as Dovima, was an American supermodel during the 1950s.

Biography
Dovima was born Dorothy Virginia Margaret Juba in Queens, New York to Stanley Juba, a Polish-American policeman who was born to Jewish parents; and Margaret J. "Peggy" Horan, who was born in Ireland. She had a younger brother, Stanley Jr. The name "Dovima" is composed of the first two letters of her three given names. She was the first model to use a single name. 

Dovima was discovered on a sidewalk in New York by an editor at Vogue, and had a photo shoot with Irving Penn the following day. Throughout her career she worked closely with Richard Avedon, whose photograph of her in a floor-length black evening gown with circus elephants—Dovima with the Elephants—taken at the Cirque d'hiver, Paris, in August 1955, became an icon and sold for $1,151,976 in 2010. The gown was the first evening dress designed for Christian Dior by his new assistant, Yves Saint-Laurent.  Dovima was reputed to be the highest-paid model of her time, demanding $60 per hour when most of the top models were receiving only around $25 per hour. She became known as the "Dollar-a-Minute Girl."

She had a minor role as Marion Funny Face. The character was aristocratic-looking but empty-headed fashion model with a Jackson Heights whine.

Dovima gave birth to a daughter named Allison on July 14, 1958, in Manhattan. Allison's father was Dovima's second husband, Allan Murray. 

Dovima was left penniless when her marriage to Murray ended in divorce. Throughout the 1960's, she first tried acting then attempted working as an agent but found little success. Eventually, by the 1970's, she had moved in with her parents in Florida, and was working as a hostess at The Two Guys Pizza Parlor in Fort Lauderdale, Florida by the 1980's.

She died of liver cancer on May 3, 1990 at the age of 62.

Filmography
 Kraft Suspense Theatre as Mrs. Aline Parmenter (1 episode, 1964)
 The Man from U.N.C.L.E. as Mrs. Karda (1 episode, 1964)
 My Favorite Martian as Model (1 episode, 1964)
 Funny Face (1957) as Marion

See also

 Dorian Leigh
 Suzy Parker

References

External links 
 
 Dovima bio (archive)

1927 births
1990 deaths
20th-century American actresses
Actresses from New York City
Female models from New York (state)
American film actresses
American television actresses
Deaths from cancer in Florida
Deaths from liver cancer